Francisco José 'Tati' Maldonado Collante (born 2 June 1981) is a Spanish former footballer who played as a forward.

Club career
Maldonado, a product of Real Betis's youth system, was born in San Fernando, Cádiz, and played for the Andalusia club four seasons, making his La Liga debut on 8 February 2003 by featuring 15 minutes in a 1–4 away loss against Real Madrid. He would only appear in four games in two seasons combined before moving to AD Ceuta and then Lorca Deportiva CF, completing successful loan spells.

During the summer of 2006, Betis re-signed Maldonado from Lorca for €62,000. He impressed during the summer friendlies, and was given a starting place against Valencia CF in a 1–2 away loss for the season opener, as a right winger in the absence of Joaquín.

Following a promising start – with another four matches in the starting XI – that included an assist against Athletic Bilbao in a 3–0 home win, Maldonado found himself out of favour with newly appointed coach Luis Fernández, and finished the campaign with 15 appearances, going scoreless in the process.

In 2007–08, Maldonado was again loaned, to second division club Gimnàstic de Tarragona. At the end of the season he joined promoted Sporting de Gijón, on a three-year deal; on 21 December 2008 he netted his first goal for the Asturians, in a 1–0 home win over UD Almería, with his team narrowly avoiding top flight relegation.

After a poor second season individually, Maldonado left for FC Cartagena in the second level. He continued competing in the category in the following years with Xerez CD, being relegated in 2013.

References

External links

1981 births
Living people
People from San Fernando, Cádiz
Sportspeople from the Province of Cádiz
Spanish footballers
Footballers from Andalusia
Association football forwards
La Liga players
Segunda División players
Segunda División B players
Tercera División players
Betis Deportivo Balompié footballers
Real Betis players
AD Ceuta footballers
Lorca Deportiva CF footballers
Gimnàstic de Tarragona footballers
Sporting de Gijón players
FC Cartagena footballers
Xerez CD footballers
San Fernando CD players
Spanish expatriate footballers
Expatriate footballers in Greece
Spanish expatriate sportspeople in Greece